The Clock or The Clocks may refer to:

Film 
 The Clock (1917 film), a silent American film
 The Clock (1945 film), a 1945 American film
 The Clock (2010 film), a 24-hour art video by Christian Marclay

Games 
 The Clock (patience), a patience or solitaire game

Literature 
 The Clock (comics), the first masked comic book crime-fighter character, initially published in 1936
 The Clocks (novel), by Agatha Christie

Music and entertainment 
 "The Clock", nickname for Haydn's Symphony No. 101
 "The Clock", a song by Paul Simon

Radio and television 
 The Clock (radio), a dramatic anthology radio series from 1946 to 1948
 The Clock (TV series), television series
 The Clock (The Americans), episode from the television series The Americans

See also
The Clocks of Iraz
Clock
Clock (disambiguation)